This is a list of Spanish monarchs, that is, rulers of the country of Spain. The forerunners of the monarchs of the Spanish throne were the following:
Kings of the Visigoths
Kings of Asturias
Kings of Navarre 
Kings of León
Kings of Galicia
Kings of Aragon
Kings of Castile

These seven lineages were eventually united by the marriage of the Catholic Monarchs, Ferdinand II of Aragon (king of the Crown of Aragon) and Isabella I of Castile (queen of the Crown of Castile). Although their kingdoms continued to be separate, with their personal union they ruled them together as one dominion. The regnal numbers follow those of the rulers of Asturias, León, and Castile; thus, Alfonso XII is numbered in succession to Alfonso XI of Castile.

House of Trastámara (1479–1555)
Under Isabella and Ferdinand, the royal dynasties of Castile and Aragon, their respective kingdoms, were united into a single line. Historiography of Spain generally treats this as the formation of the Kingdom of Spain, but in formality, the two kingdoms continued for many centuries with their own separate institutions. It was not until the Nueva Planta decrees of 1707–1716 that the two lands were formally merged into a single state.

Joanna was confined from 1509 till her death for alleged insanity.

House of Habsburg (1516–1700)

Following the deaths of Isabella (1504) and Ferdinand (1516), their daughter Joanna inherited the Spanish kingdoms. However, she was kept prisoner at Tordesillas due to an alleged mental disorder. As Joanna's son, Charles I (the future Holy Roman Emperor Charles V), did not want to be merely a regent, he proclaimed himself king of Castile and Aragon jointly with his mother. Subsequently, Castilian and Aragonese Cortes alleged oath to him as co-monarch with his mother. Upon her death, he became sole King of Castile and Aragon, and the thrones were left permanently united to Philip II of Spain and successors. Traditional numbering of monarchs follows the Castillian crown; i.e. after King Ferdinand (II of Aragon and V of Castile jure uxoris as husband of Queen of Castille Isabella I), the next Ferdinand was numbered VI.  Likewise, Alfonso XII takes his number following that of Alfonso XI of Castile rather than that of Alfonso V of Aragon, the prior Spanish monarchs with that name.

In the year 1700, Charles II died. His will named the 16-year-old Philip, the grandson of Charles's sister Maria Theresa of Spain, as his successor to the whole Spanish Empire. Upon any possible refusal of the undivided Spanish possessions, the Crown of Spain would be offered next to Philip's younger brother Charles, Duke of Berry, or, next, to Archduke Charles of Austria.

Both claimants, both Charles of Austria and Philip, had a legal right to the Spanish throne because Philip's grandfather, King Louis XIV of France and Charles's father, Leopold I, Holy Roman Emperor, were sons of Charles II's aunts, Anne and Maria Anna.  Philip claimed primogeniture because Anne was older than Maria Anna. However, Philip IV had stipulated in his will the succession should pass to the Austrian Habsburg line, and the Austrian branch also claimed that Maria Theresa, Philip's grandmother, had renounced the Spanish throne for herself and her descendants as part of her marriage contract. This was countered by the French claim that it was on the basis of a dowry that had never been paid.

After a long council meeting where the Dauphin spoke up in favour of his son's rights, it was agreed that Philip would ascend the throne. Following this, the War of the Spanish Succession broke out and Archduke Charles was also proclaimed king of Spain, as Charles III, in opposition to Philip V. He was proclaimed in Vienna, and also in Madrid in the years 1706 and 1710.  Charles renounced his claims to the Spanish throne in the Treaty of Rastatt of 1714, but was allowed the continued use of the styles of a Spanish monarch for his lifetime. Philip ascended the Spanish throne but had to renounce his claim to the throne of France for himself and his descendants.

Disputed claimant of the House of Habsburg

House of Bourbon (1700–1808)

House of Bonaparte (1808–1813)

The only monarch from this dynasty was Joseph I, imposed by his brother Napoleon I of France after Charles IV and Ferdinand VII had abdicated. The title used by Joseph I was King of the Spains and the Indias, by the Grace of God and the Constitution of the State. He was also later given all of the titles of the previous kings. A government in opposition to the French was formed in Cádiz on 25 September 1808, which continued to recognize the imprisoned Ferdinand VII as king. This government was diplomatically recognized as the legitimate Spanish government by Britain and other countries at war with France.

House of Bourbon (1813–1868)

Charles IV's eldest son was restored to the throne. Again, the title used was king of Castile, Leon, Aragon,… by the Grace of God.

House of Savoy (1870–1873)

After the Spanish Revolution of 1868 deposed Isabella II, while a new monarch was sought, a provisional government and a regency headed by Francisco Serrano y Domínguez from 8 October 1868 until 2 January 1871 was established. Amadeo was elected as king and the new title used was King of Spain, by the Grace of God and will of the nation.

Spanish Republic (1873–1874)

House of Bourbon (1874–1931)

Isabella II's eldest son was restored to the throne as she had abdicated in his favour in 1870. Constitutional King of Spain.

Spanish Republic (1931–1939)

Dictatorship of Francisco Franco (1936–1975)
On 1 October 1936, General Francisco Franco was proclaimed "Leader of Spain" (Spanish: Caudillo de España) in the parts of Spain controlled by the Nationalists (nacionales) after the Spanish Civil War broke out. At the end of the war on 1 April 1939, General Franco took control of the whole of Spain. In 1947, Franco proclaimed the restoration of the monarchy but did not allow the pretender, Juan, Count of Barcelona, to take the throne. In 1969, Franco declared that Juan Carlos, Prince of Spain, the Count of Barcelona's son, would be his successor. After Franco's death in 1975, Juan Carlos succeeded him as the King of Spain.

House of Bourbon (1975–present)

Alfonso XIII's claim descended (due to his two eldest sons' renunciations) to his third son, Juan of Bourbon, Count of Barcelona, who was passed over in favour of his eldest son, whose title is King of Spain. The Count of Barcelona formally renounced his claims in favour of his son in 1977, two years after Franco's death and Juan Carlos's accession.

Juan Carlos abdicated in favor of his son Felipe VI, who became king on 19 June 2014, with Felipe's older daughter, Leonor, next in succession.

See also
Family tree of Spanish monarchs
List of heads of state of Spain
List of Spanish regents
List of Succession to the Spanish Throne
List of monarchs of the Kingdom of the Two Sicilies
Royal Consorts of Spain
Spanish monarchy
War of the Spanish Succession

Notes

References

External links 
Monarchs of Spain (700–present)

Spain
List
Lists of Spanish nobility